Mamadou Sarr may refer to:

Mamadou Sarr (athlete) (1938–2022), Senegalese sprinter
Mamadou Sarr (footballer) (born 2005), French footballer